Franz Xaver Nagl S.T.D. (26 November 1855 – 4 February 1913) was a Cardinal of the Roman Catholic Church and Archbishop of Vienna as well as Titular Latin Archbishop of Tyre.

Biography
Nagl was born in Vienna, Austria, as the son of Leopold Nagl, a doorman, and Barbara Kloiber. He was educated at the Seminary of Krems and later at the Seminary of Sankt Pölten from 1874 until 1878, then finally at the University of Vienna, where he earned a doctorate in theology in 1883. He was ordained on 14 July 1878 and did pastoral work in the archdiocese of Vienna until 1882, when he was appointed chaplain of S. Maria dell'Anima in Rome, where he served until 1883. He was professor of philosophy and exegesis at the Seminary of Sankt Pölten until 1885. He was Chaplain at the Imperial Court of Vienna from 1885 until 1887. He was Rector of the Priest College and Church S. Maria dell'Anima from 1889 until 1902. He was created Protonotary apostolic in 1893 and was Canon of the cathedral chapter of Vienna.

Episcopate
Pope Leo XIII appointed him Bishop of Trieste and Capodistria on 2 June 1902, and he was consecrated on 15 June.  He was promoted to the titular see of Tiro and appointed coadjutor bishop of Vienna on 19 January 1910, succeeding to the metropolitan see of Vienna on 5 August 1911.

Cardinalate
He was created Cardinal-Priest of San Marco in the consistory of 27 November 1911 by Pope Pius X. During his time as Archbishop of Vienna he was a counselor to Emperor Franz Josef I of Austria and member of the Chamber of Lords and of the Landtag. He died in 1913.

References

1855 births
1913 deaths
Higher Scientific Institute for Diocesan Priests at St. Augustine's alumni
Archbishops of Vienna
20th-century Austrian cardinals
Cardinals created by Pope Pius X